Babul may refer to:
Babul, Iran, a city in Mazandaran Province, Iran
Babul (tree) (Acacia nilotica), the gum arabic tree, an acacia native to India, Pakistan, and Africa
 Babul (Hindi word) (or Baabul), an archaic Hindi word for father used in songs
 Babul (1950 film), a 1950 Hindi film starring Dilip Kumar and Nargis
 Baabul (2006 film), a 2006 Hindi film starring Amitabh Bachchan, Hema Malini and Salman Khan

People
 Babul Datta (born 1956), Indian cricketer
 Babul Supriyo (born 1970), Indian playback singer, actor, and politician
 Nurul Islam Babul (1946–2020), Bangladeshi businessman